The 1988–89 Boise State Broncos men's basketball team represented Boise State University during the 1988–89 NCAA Division I men's basketball season. The Broncos were led by sixth-year head coach Bobby Dye and played their home games on campus at the BSU Pavilion in Boise, Idaho.

In the conference tournament at home in Boise, the top-seeded Broncos again received a bye into the semifinals and defeated Weber State by eleven points. They met second-seeded Idaho in the final and fell by seven.

With the NCAA tournament on their home floor, BSU was invited to the National Invitation Tournament (NIT), and traveled to  Stillwater, Oklahoma, where they lost by fourteen points to the Oklahoma State Cowboys of the Big Eight Conference.

The Broncos were led on the court by senior guard Chris Childs, who went on to a lengthy professional career, ending with nine years

Postseason results

|-
!colspan=6 style=| Big Sky tournament

|-
!colspan=6 style=| National Invitation tournament

References

External links
Sports Reference – Boise State Broncos – 1988–89 basketball season

Boise State Broncos men's basketball seasons
Boise State
Boise State
Boise State